Kurukula may refer to:

Karave, a caste of the Sri Lankan Sinhalese people
Karaiyar, a caste of the Sri Lankan Tamils